Promised Land (Hebrew הארץ המובטחת) is a 2004 French-Israeli film, directed by Amos Gitai and starring Rosamund Pike, Diana Bespechni, and Hanna Schygulla. It tells the story of a group of East European girls smuggled into Israel to serve as prostitutes. The film is the first of Gitai's "Frontier" trilogy and premiered at the Venice Film Festival.

Director Gitai commented on the film: "If I have succeeded in spoiling even one man's appetite, and causing him to stop going to prostitutes - then I feel I have succeeded in doing something."

Synopsis 
The film opens at night in the Sinai desert. Under the moonlight, a group of men and women warm themselves around a campfire. Women come from Eastern Europe expecting to work as prostitutes in nice hotels in Egypt. Tomorrow they will suffer rape, humiliation and will be auctioned off by a Frenchwoman named Anne. They will pass from hand to hand, victims of a network of prostitution, eventually being smuggled into Israel to work in a Red Sea resort nightclub.

One night, at the brothel, Diana meets an English woman called Rose. She begs her for help. Their meeting is a sign of hope in the plight of these women.

Cast
 Rosamund Pike  : Rose
 Diana Bespechni  : Diana
 Anne Parillaud  : Anne
 Hanna Schygulla  : Hanna
 Yussuf Abu-Warda  : Yussuf
 Amos Lavie  : Hezi

Awards
 CinemAvvenire Award, Cinema for Peace Award at the 2004 Venice Film Festival.

References

External links
 

2004 films
English-language Israeli films
Films about prostitution in Israel
Films directed by Amos Gitai